Le dolci zie (i.e. "The Sweet Aunts") is a 1975 commedia sexy all'italiana written and directed by  Mario Imperoli and starring Pascale Petit, Femi Benussi,  and Marisa Merlini.

Plot 
When young Libero loses his parents he is taken in by his disreputable atheist grandfather and the girl who shares his life, previously a prostitute, on their farm. However, the court decides that until he comes of age he must be brought up by his three unmarried aunts, all of impeccable morals, and with the help of a priest and a policeman the three remove him to their home. The eldest sister has long given up hope of finding a husband, but the two younger and prettier ones are excited by the handsome newcomer and in making a great fuss of him arouse his masculinity. One of them gives music lessons and one of her pupils, closer to Libero's age, sets her sights on him. The grandfather is happy to see the boy matched with anybody other than the aunts he despises as devout virgins and hypocrites.

Cast 

 Femi Benussi as Mimì
 Pascale Petit as Benedetta
 Marisa Merlini as  Fiorella
  Jean-Claude Vernè as  Libero
  Patrizia Gori as  Anna
 Mario Maranzana as Grandpa
 Orchidea De Santis as  Manuela
 Pupo De Luca as Don Fiorello

See also
 List of Italian films of 1975

References

External links

Commedia sexy all'italiana
1970s sex comedy films
Films directed by Mario Imperoli
1975 comedy films
1975 films
1970s Italian-language films
1970s Italian films